The Windsor Road cycleway is a predominantly off-road  cyclepath between Parramatta Park and Macquarie Street,  that is generally aligned with the Windsor Road and Old Windsor Road.

Route

The cycleway accesses the North-West T-way between Darcy Road,  to Windsor. Some major road crossings are required, particularly on Old Windsor Road but all are controlled by traffic lights. Between the  stretch from Westmead to Rouse Hill there are some 26 traffic light controlled road crossings and therefore riding along this cycleway is a very stop-start process. There is a steep climb from Abbott Road up to Seven Hills Road when travelling north.

See also
Bike paths in Sydney
Cycling in New South Wales
Cycling in Sydney

References

External links
Bicycle NSW website
Bike North website

Cycleways in Australia
Cycling in Sydney
Transport infrastructure in Parramatta